Daniel Nwoke (born 16 June 1983 in Nigeria) is a Nigerian retired professional footballer who is last known to have played for Qormi of the Maltese Premier League from 2011 to 2012.

Career

Malta

Journeying to Malta for the prevalence of football opportunities there in 2001, Nwoke trialed for Birkirkara that year which proved unsuccessful.

Nwoke was on the verge of taking up contract with Pieta Hotspurs in 2005 but the deal fell through.

Attracting foreign interest through his time with Msida, the Nigerian concluded a move to Qormi in 2011, bagging four goals in his first 2 outings and earning the Player of the Month award for January. before parting ways with the club in early 2012.

Finland

On trial with Tampere United, then of the Finnish Veikkausliiga in 2006,
Nwoke extended his contract in 2008, parting ways with the club in 2009 and trialling with Hämeenlinna in 2012.

References

External links 
 Nwoke lands Msida semi-final berth
 Finnish Wikipedia Page
 at Soccerway

Living people
Nigerian expatriate footballers
Association football forwards
1983 births
Expatriate footballers in Malta
Floriana F.C. players
Msida Saint-Joseph F.C. players
PK-35 Vantaa (men) players
Nigerian footballers
Expatriate footballers in Finland
Sportspeople from Lagos
Naxxar Lions F.C. players
Qormi F.C. players
Tampere United players
Veikkausliiga players